Rødtvet is a station on Grorud Line (Lines 4 and 5) of the Oslo Metro. The station is located in north-central Groruddalen, between the stations of Veitvet and Kalbakken,  from Stortinget.

The station was opened 10 October 1966 as part of the original stretch of the Grorud Line. The station's architect was Karl Stenersen.

References

External links

Oslo Metro stations in Oslo
Railway stations opened in 1966
1966 establishments in Norway